The 1990 Scottish Cup Final was the 105th final of the Scottish Cup, Scottish football's most prestigious knock-out association football competition. The match took place at Hampden Park on 12 May 1990 and was contested by Scottish Premier Division clubs Aberdeen and Celtic. It was Aberdeen's 13th and Celtic's 45th Scottish Cup Final. The clubs had previously met at the same stage of the tournament on five occasions. Celtic were the defending champions of the competition from the previous two seasons having defeated Rangers and Dundee United respectively.

As Scottish Premier Division clubs, Aberdeen and Celtic both entered the competition in the third round. Aberdeen won all of its four fixtures before the final on its first attempt whilst Celtic needed one replay to see off Premier Division club Dunfermline Athletic in the quarter-finals. Aberdeen knocked out Division One clubs Partick Thistle and Morton before defeating Premier Division clubs Heart of Midlothian and Dundee United before the final. Celtic also defeated two Division One clubs as well as Old Firm and Premier Division rivals Rangers in the fourth round.

The match was Celtic's 45th appearance in the final while it was Aberdeen's 13th. Both clubs had met in the final on five occasions beforehand  in 1937, 1954, 1967, 1970 and 1984 with Celtic winning three over Aberdeen's two. Celtic had previously won the tournament 29 times whilst Aberdeen only six times, four coming in the previous nine seasons. Aberdeen were favourites to win the match on this occasion having finished well ahead of Celtic in the league, and having beaten the Glasgow side 3–1 at Parkhead a mere ten days earlier. 

Aberdeen won the match 9–8 on penalties after a 0–0 draw over 90 minutes of normal play and 30 minutes of extra-time.  With the shoot-out poised at 3-4 Celtic bound striker Charlie Nicholas was required to score to send the shoot-out to Sudden Death.  After a further 8 consecutive successful penalty kicks Celtic's Anton Rogan missed the penultimate kick, allowing Brian Irvine to win the tie and claim Aberdeen's seventh Scottish Cup victory.

Route to the final

Match details

References

1990
Cup Final
Scottish Cup Final 1990
Scottish Cup Final 1990
Association football penalty shoot-outs
20th century in Glasgow
May 1990 sports events in the United Kingdom